The Joseph Shepard Building, also known as the Joseph Shepard Federal Building or the Government of Canada Building or simply 4900 Yonge is an office complex used by the federal government of Canada in Toronto, Ontario, Canada. Located on Yonge Street in the North York neighbourhood of Lansing, the building lies within North York City Centre. 

Built in 1977 as a medium-sized, planned consolidation project to service residents of the former Metropolitan Toronto districts of North York and Etobicoke, the building houses offices for passport services, Service Canada, Employment and Social Development Canada, Immigration, Refugees and Citizenship Canada, and Canadian Forces recruiting centre in addition to other federal departments. The building was designed by Macy DuBois and is a Classified Federal Heritage Building. The building is named for Joseph Shepard, an early settler in North York whom acquired  of land nearby and also the namesake of Sheppard Avenue.

The structure, with its multi-layered design, stands out among the surrounding skyscrapers along Yonge Street, which were built during the office boom of the 1990s surrounding the diversification of North York City Centre. The building is within walking distance to Sheppard–Yonge subway station and short distance from Ontario Highway 401.

The building is one of two buildings used by the federal government in North York, the other being the Environment and Climate Change Canada Building near York University Heights. Other federal facilities in Toronto include the Dominion Public Building, the Canada Centre Building, and the Health Canada Building; the latter two buildings located in the former city of Scarborough.

Stabbing
On March 14, 2016, two members of the Canadian Forces recruiting centre were stabbed by someone carrying a knife.

References

External links
 Joseph Sheppard Federal Building

1977 establishments in Ontario
Buildings and structures in Toronto
Canadian federal government buildings
Classified Federal Heritage Building
Government buildings completed in 1977
Modernist architecture in Canada
North York
Office buildings in Canada

fr:Édifice du gouvernement du Canada à North York